The 1951 Ball State Cardinals football team was an American football team that represented Ball State Teachers College (later renamed Ball State University) in the Indiana Collegiate Conference (ICC) during the 1951 college football season. In its 16th season under head coach John Magnabosco, the team compiled a 0–6–1 record and finished in last place in the ICC.

Schedule

References

Ball State
Ball State Cardinals football seasons
Ball State Cardinals football